The Socotra leaf-toed gecko (Hemidactylus forbesii) is a species of gecko. It is endemic to Abd al-Kuri in the Socotra archipelago.

References

Endemic fauna of Socotra
Reptiles of the Middle East
Hemidactylus
Reptiles described in 1899